The Winnipeg Folk Festival is a nonprofit charitable organization with an annual summer folk music festival held in Birds Hill Provincial Park, near Winnipeg, Manitoba, Canada. The festival features a variety of artists and music from around the world and is sure to include a number of local artists.

Begun by Mitch Podolak, Colin Gorrie, and Ava Kobrinsky in 1974 as a celebration of Winnipeg's centennial, the festival itself has grown into an event exceeding 70,000 attendees to the festival annually. The festival is held over the second weekend of July, beginning on Thursday night and running through to Sunday night.

Beyond the four-day festival, the organization offers year-round concert programming at venues throughout the city bringing in artists as well as organizing free concert programming throughout the city.

Music 
The festival offers a wide selection of music over the four-day festival. Throughout the year the organization facilitates the Hear All Year concert series.

Festival programming 
There is a large variety of music at the festival, including bluegrass, Celtic, blues, roots, indie folk, Americana, folk rock, French Canadian, contemporary singer-songwriters, and a variety of children's performers. Every year artists join the lineup from all over North America and across the world. The Winnipeg Folk Festival hosts over 70 artists annually from nearly 10 different countries including Australia, Colombia, Iceland, Ireland, Mexico, Netherlands, Niger, United Kingdom and more with the majority of the acts coming from Canada and the United States.

The festival showcases several genres every summer. Past performers include Bahamas, Joan Baez, Barenaked Ladies, Blue Rodeo, Oscar Brand, Brandi Carlile, Bruce Cockburn, City and Colour, Courtney Barnett, Ray Davies, Death Cab for Cutie, Elle King, Mimi Farina, Feist, Stephane Grappelli, Great Big Sea, Arlo Guthrie, Half Moon Run, Emmylou Harris, Levon Helm, John Hiatt, Jason Mraz, Kacey Musgraves, k.d. lang, K'naan, Lyle Lovett, Nick Lowe, Natalie MacMaster, Odetta, Passenger, Pete Seeger, Sheryl Crow, The Shins, Stan Rogers and The Strumbellas, Jeff Tweedy, Townes van Zandt, Kurt Vile, and Wilco. 

Each year the Winnipeg Folk Festival showcases local Manitoba talent including Begonia, Boniface, The Bros. Landreth, John K. Samson, Leonard Sumner, Living Hour, Richard Inman, Roger Roger, Royal Canoe, William Prince and more.

History

Winnipeg Centennial Folksong Festival, 1974 

The first Winnipeg folk festival was held August 9 - 11, 1974 at Birds Hill Provincial Park. The free concert was staged with funding from the Centennial Committee and the CBC. The event depended on the collective work of many local volunteers so the organizers developed an organizational structure that embodied their philosophy that everyone contributing was a significant participant. Subsequent events built on the foundation of this initial idea creating a model that heavily influenced the operation of other similar festivals in Canada, particularly the Vancouver Folk Music Festival and the Edmonton Folk Festival.

Performers at the first festival included:

Honorary members 

 Mitch Podolak (Founder/Director/Artistic Director), 1974–1975
 Colin Gorrie (Founder), 1974–1975
 Ava Kobrinsky (Founder), 1976–1989
 Nate Nurgitz (Board Legal Advisor), 1975–85
 Bill Merritt (Business/general manager), 1977–1994
 Jon Singleton (Past Treasurer), 1978–1987

Past Executive Directors 

 Trudy Schroeder, 1999–2008
 Tamara Kater, 2008–2011

Past Artistic Directors 

 Mitch Podolak, 1974–1986
 Rosalie Goldstein, 1987–1991
 Pierre Guérin, 1992–2000
 Rick Fenton, 2001–2004

Past President and Chairs 

 Peter Stringham, 1976–1979
 Greg Brunskill, 1980
 Derek Black, 1981–1987
 Jane Graham, 1988–1990
 David Asper, 1991–1992
 Michael Handler, 1993–1995
 Brenda Prosken, 1996–1998
 Gloria Koop, 1999–2000
 Gerry Couture, 2001–2002
 Sandra Altner 2003–2004
 Terry Sargeant 2005–2009
 Allan Finkel 2010–2011
 Gerry Couture, 2012
 Mike Baudic, 2012–2015
 Karen-Denise Cyr, 2015–2017

References

Music festivals in Winnipeg
Folk festivals in Canada
Music festivals established in 1974
Annual events in Winnipeg
1974 establishments in Manitoba